Adar (also Romanized as Ādār; also known as Adād and Āvār) is a village in Hesar-e Valiyeasr Rural District, Central District, Avaj County, Qazvin Province, Iran. At the 2006 census, its population was 388, in 82 families.

References 

Populated places in Avaj County